Sessenhausen is an Ortsgemeinde – a community belonging to a Verbandsgemeinde – in the Westerwaldkreis in Rhineland-Palatinate, Germany.

Geography

The rural residential community of Sessenhausen lies 4 km west of Selters. The community belongs to the Verbandsgemeinde of Selters, a kind of collective municipality. Its seat is in the like-named town.

History
In 1227, Sessenhausen had its first documentary mention as Sasinhusin. In 1758 it was mentioned as Sassenhusen,  and then later as Sachsenhausen and Sassenhausen.

Politics

The municipal council is made up of 12 council members, as well as the honorary and presiding mayor (Ortsbürgermeister), who were elected in a majority vote in a municipal election on 13 June 2004.

Economy and infrastructure

North of the community runs Bundesstraße 413, leading from Bendorf to Hachenburg. The nearest Autobahn interchange is Dierdorf on the A 3 (Cologne–Frankfurt). The nearest InterCityExpress stop is the railway station at Montabaur on the Cologne-Frankfurt high-speed rail line.

References

External links
Sessenhausen in the collective municipality’s Web pages 

Municipalities in Rhineland-Palatinate
Westerwaldkreis